Petz Rescue: Ocean Patrol is a game for the Nintendo DS developer by French studio Magic Pockets. It is published by Ubisoft. The game takes place on a tropical island and the player goes on rescue missions to save marine life. It is the sequel to wild petz dolphins.

Game experience 
When the player first turns on the game they will have only two dolphins,  then the user is given a schedule where they are offered a job (i.e. feed  dolphins). The user can then go on a rescue mission to save an animal.  The game starts each day by sending the user on a new animal rescue  mission. When you save an animal for the first time, you have to make a lagoon for it and clean up the lagoon beforehand. When you don't receive a signal that an animal is in danger, it most likely means that an animal will have a baby.

Animals 
Dolphin
Orca
Sea lions
Sea turtle
Great white shark
Whale shark
Sharks
Manatees
Sting rays
Polar bears
Emperor penguin
Beluga

Characters 
Greg - Main character, kidnapped by agent TALL and SMALL, along with their uncle bob.
Mila - Greg's sister, another main character who was kidnapped too.
Uncle Bob - Greg and Mila's uncle and manager of the sanctuary. he was tied to a chair and shipped to the island.
Rick Order - the communications expert on the island, he's the one who receives animal in distress and gives it to Greg and Mila.
Moorse - Rick's pet seagull, he is called Moorse for his skill to squawk in Moorse code.
Tevii - a trainer
Lara - a treasure hunter on the island.
Suma - a crazy hermit on the island, knows a lot about the whale god nolappa labba.
Jacues - the sailor and a real pirate, helps Greg and Mila on rescue missions.
Diana - an old friend of Greg and Mila, now an animal nurse.
Agent TALL and SMALL - two Wazaps agents who kidnapped the two teens Greg and Mila.
Gloria - the founder and owner of the Wazaps.
Brittina - the schedule keeper of the island.
David  - the villain, kills animals for money, tries to sabotage the reserve, he also tries to kill the whale god!
Seraphine and Paku - two first two animals of the sanctuary. Seraphine is a female bottlenose dolphin and also gives birth, and Paku is a male spotted dolphin.

2008 video games
Nintendo DS games
Nintendo DS-only games
North America-exclusive video games
Ubisoft games
Magic Pockets games
Video games developed in France
Virtual pet video games
Single-player video games